The 1949–50 Oberliga  was the fifth season of the Oberliga, the first tier of the football league system in West Germany. The league operated in six regional divisions, Berlin, North, South, Southwest (north and south) and West. The five league champions and runners-up as well as the third and fourth placed teams in the West and South and the third placed team in the Southwest and North entered the 1950 German football championship which was won by VfB Stuttgart. It was VfB Stuttgart's first-ever national championship.

The 1949–50 season was the last with clubs from East Berlin in the Oberliga, with VfB Pankow and Union Oberschöneweide leaving the league at the end of the season, thereby ending unified German league football for the next four decades. Union Oberschöneweide was replaced by the West Berlin club Union 06 Berlin, formed by former Oberschöneweide players who had moved to the West.

For the Oberliga Südwest, covering the whole of the French occupation zone in Germany, it was the last season of the league  being divided into two regional divisions, north and south. The clubs from the southern division re-joined the Southern German Football Association at the end of seasons with two clubs entering the Oberliga Süd for the following season, three clubs the 2. Oberliga Süd and the rest being relegated to the Amateurligas.

A similar-named league, the DDR-Oberliga, existed in East Germany, set at the first tier of the East German football league system. The 1949–50 DDR-Oberliga, the inaugural season of the league, was won by ZSG Horch Zwickau.

Oberliga Nord
The 1949–50 season saw three new clubs promoted to the league, Hannover 96, Harburger TB and VfB Oldenburg, while Holstein Kiel was re-admitted after initially having been forcibly relegated during the previous season. The league's top scorer was Adolf Vetter of VfL Osnabrück with 28 goals, the third consecutive time he finished as top scorer.

Oberliga Berlin
The 1949–50 season saw three new clubs promoted to the league, Hertha BSC Berlin, VfB Britz and Tasmania 1900 Berlin. The league's top scorer was Heinz Rogge of Union Oberschöneweide with 29 goals.

Oberliga West
The 1949–50 season saw four new clubs promoted to the league, 1. FC Köln, Arminia Bielefeld, FV Duisburg 08 and Duisburger SV. The league's top scorer was Alfred Preißler of Borussia Dortmund with 24 goals.

Oberliga Südwest

Northern group
The 1949–50 season saw four new clubs promoted to the league, VfR Kaiserslautern, ASV Landau, VfR Kirn and FV Engers. The league's top scorers were Werner Baßler and Ottmar Walter of 1. FC Kaiserslautern with 45 goals each, the highest total for the Oberliga's in 1949–50.

Southern group
The 1949–50 season saw five new clubs promoted to the league, FV Kuppenheim, FV Lahr, SV Trossingen SV Hechingen and TV Ebingen. The division was disbanded at the end of the season.

Final
The winners of the two regional divisions of the Oberliga Südwest played a final to determine the league champion who was also directly qualified for the German championship:

|}

The runners-up of the two divisions determined the club who would face the loser of the championship final for the second place in the German championship:

|}

|}

The third-placed teams of the two divisions determined the club who would face the loser of the second-place final for the third place in the German championship:

|}

|}

Oberliga Süd
The 1949–50 season saw two new clubs promoted to the league, SpVgg Fürth and Jahn Regensburg. The league's top scorer was Horst Schade of SpVgg Fürth with 21 goals.

German championship

The 1950 German football championship was contested by the eight qualified Oberliga teams and won by VfB Stuttgart, defeating Kickers Offenbach in the final. It was the last edition with sixteen clubs in the championship playing a knock-out format. From 1951 onwards the finals were played with eight clubs and in group stages.

References

Sources
 30 Jahre Bundesliga  30th anniversary special, publisher: kicker Sportmagazin, published: 1993
 kicker-Almanach 1990  Yearbook of German football, publisher: kicker Sportmagazin, published: 1989, 
 DSFS Liga-Chronik seit 1945  publisher: DSFS, published: 2005
 100 Jahre Süddeutscher Fußball-Verband  100 Years of the Southern German Football Federation, publisher: SFV, published: 1997

External links
 The Oberligas on Fussballdaten.de 

1949-50
1
Ger